Mont Aigoual (elevation 1567m / 5141 ft) is the highest point of the Gard department, France. It is part of the Massif Central, and it is located within the Cévennes National Park. Its southern slopes are the source of the river Hérault flowing into the Mediterranean.

When the sky is clear, it is possible to see the Mediterranean Sea, the Pyrenees, and also the Alps and Mont Blanc in particular. The summit is accessible by car from a variety of converging surfaced approaches.

Geography and climate
This granite and schist outcrop is a major water catchment area in the Massif Central, being located where clouds from the cold Atlantic converge with warm Mediterranean air currents. The heavy rainfall has given the mountain its name: originally "Aiqualis" ('the watery one'). Mont Aigoual forms part of the watershed between the Mediterranean and Atlantic.

The meteorological observatory, built in 1887 by the French Rivers Authority and Forestry Commission under the direction of Georges Fabre, is currently occupied by the French meteorological service (Météo France).  It is the last remaining weather station in France which is still inhabited by meteorologists. An exhibition on weather forecasting is open to visitors in the summer months.

Severe weather conditions are sometimes recorded:

 Maximum Temperature : 29.9 °C in 2019;
 Minimum Temperature : -28 °C in 1956;
 Maximum wind speed : 360 km/h on November 1, 1968;
 Maximum rain in 24 hours: 607 mm from 6 p.m. on 30th to 6 p.m. on October 31, 1963;
 Maximum snow during one year : 10.24 metres;
 Frozen days: 144;
 High temperature days (> 25 °C) : 0;
 Rain days: 170;
 High wind days (> 16 m/s) : 265;
 Fog days: 241;
 Days with snow: 116.

Mont Aigoual features a cool-summer variant of an oceanic climate (Cfc), bordering to a subpolar (Dfc) (highland) climate.

Tour de France

The climb featured in the 2020 Tour de France on Stage 6 as a summit finish from Le Teil. The winner was the Kazakh cyclist Alexey Lutsenko of Astana Pro Team.

The Rider by Tim Krabbé
The Tour of Mont Aigoual is the semi-fictional cycle race in the book The Rider by Tim Krabbé.

The race is recreated on the Rapha and on the inrng weblogs

References

 Green Guide:Languedoc, Roussillon, Tarn Gorges pp65–68, Michelin Tyre PLC, 1998 
 The Rider - Tim Krabbe, Bloomsbury Publishing, 2002 

Massif Central
Mountains of Gard